Itapissuma is a city in the state of Pernambuco, Brazil. It is integrated in the Recife metropolitan area with another 13 cities. Itapissuma has a total area of 74.25 square kilometers and had an estimated population of 26,900 inhabitants in 2020 according to the  IBGE. The city has the best children's mortality rate in the metropolitan area and has also the second highest GDP per capita after Ipojuca.

Geography
 State - Pernambuco
 Region - RMR (Recife)
 Boundaries - Goiana (N), Igarassu (S and W), and  Itamaraca (E)
 Area - 74.25 km2
 Elevation - 7 m (22 ft)
 Hydrography - Small coast river
 Vegetation - Mangrove, coconut trees and sugarcane plantation
 Climate - Hot tropical and humid
 Annual average temperature - 25.3 c
 Main road -  BR 101 and PE 035
 Distance to Recife - 39 km

Economy

The main economic activities in Itapissuma are based in metallurgic  (aluminium) and general industry (which counts for 63% of the local economy) and the primary sector especially farms with pigs and coconut.

Economic Indicators

Economy by Sector (2006)

Health Indicators

References

Municipalities in Pernambuco